KAB-1500 is a Russian precision guided weapon which comes in three versions: KAB-1500L, KAB-1500S-E and TV-guided KAB-1500KR.

Variants
 KAB-1500LG-F-E Guided bomb with a laser gyro-stabilized seeker and a high-explosive warhead
 KAB-1500LG-Pr-E Guided bomb with a laser gyro-stabilized seeker and a penetrator warhead
 KAB-1500LG-OD-E Guided bomb with a laser gyro-stabilized seeker and a fuel-air-explosive warhead
 KAB-1500Kr-Pr Guided bomb with an electro-optical correlation seeker and a penetrator warhead 
 KAB-1500Kr Guided bomb with an electro-optical correlation TV seeker and a HE warhead
 KAB-1500Kr-OD Guided bomb with an electro-optical correlation TV seeker and a FAE warhead

References

Guided bombs
Aerial bombs of Russia